Peltodytes litoralis is a species of beetle in the genus Peltodytes described in 1912.

References

Haliplidae
Beetles described in 1912